Highway 919 is a provincial highway in the north-west region of the Canadian province of Saskatchewan. It runs from Highway 21 / Highway 950 to a dead end on the Cold Lake Air Weapons Range. Highway 919 is about 46 km (29 mi) long.

About two-thirds of Highway 919 lies within the Meadow Lake Provincial Park and several recreational areas, two lakes (Pierce and Cold), and campgrounds are accessible from this portion of the highway.

See also 
Roads in Saskatchewan
Transportation in Saskatchewan

References 

919